Chapi may refer to:

 a hoe used by the slaves on Curaçao for agriculture and also used as a percussion instrument
 a sub-tribe of Mara people in north eastern state of Mizoram
 Chapi language, the language of the subtribe
 Chapi, Mizoram, 2 kilometers from India-Myanmar border in east side of southernmost part of Mizoram state
 Chapi (name), a common name among the Aushi people of Luapula Province, Zambia
Chapi (Kurdish dance)
 David Vázquez González, Spanish footballer nicknamed Chapi
Ruperto Chapí, Spanish classical composer 
Chapi (Peru), a mountain in Peru
Chapi, Iran, a village in Mazandaran Province, Iran
Chapi (footballer), retired Spanish footballer
Chapi Romano, Argentine footballer